Sebastian Senatore (born 17 December 1985) is a Uruguayan-born Swedish footballer who plays for Nacka FF as a defender.

References

External links
 
 Elite Prospects profile

1985 births
Living people
Footballers from Montevideo
Uruguayan expatriate footballers
Uruguayan footballers
Uruguayan expatriate sportspeople in Sweden
Swedish footballers
Association football defenders
Hammarby Fotboll players
Montevideo Wanderers F.C. players
Syrianska FC players
Vasalunds IF players
Gefle IF players
Superettan players
Allsvenskan players
AFC Eskilstuna players
Hammarby Talang FF players
Varbergs BoIS players
Boo FK players